Nienburg is a town in the district of Salzlandkreis in Saxony-Anhalt, Germany. It is located in the lower Saale valley, approx. 5 km northeast of Bernburg. In January 2010 it absorbed the former municipalities Gerbitz, Latdorf, Neugattersleben, Pobzig and Wedlitz, that became Ortschaften or municipal divisions of the town. In 2020 its population was 6,104.

Nienburg is first mentioned in travel records dating from 961. The medieval centre of the town is occupied by the Benedictine monastery, Nienburg Abbey, later turned into a castle, recently destroyed by fire. The church of the monastery, over 1000 years old, was inaugurated in 1004, and is beautifully preserved to this day.

In 1623, during the Thirty Years' War, part of the town was destroyed. On December 6, 1825, an early cable-stayed bridge over the river Saale collapsed during a celebration honoring the bridge's patron.  55 people were killed, 60 were injured, and two people remained missing.  The bridge had been open for just three months.  A contributing factor may have been youths attempting to get the bridge to sway to the tune of "God Save the King."

Personality 
 Gustav Flügel (1812–1900), composer
 Annalista Saxo, Nienburg chronicler
 Ibrahim ibn Jaqub, traveler, first mention of Nienburg
 Odo I, Margrave of the Saxon Ostmark (around 930–983), buried in the monastery Nienburg an der Saale

References

External links
 

 
Salzlandkreis
Duchy of Anhalt